Rachavaripalem is a village in Maddipadu mandal in Prakasam district in the state of Andhra Pradesh in India.

Location
It is surrounded by River Gundlakamma on three sides of village.

Demographics 
As of 2014 India census, Rachavaripalem had a population of 1,292.  Of 578 Males and 714 Females. Having total houses of 551.

Gallary 
<TBD>

See also 

Maddipadu mandal

References 

Populated waterside places in India
Villages in Prakasam district